The Tydings–McDuffie Act, officially the Philippine Independence Act, is an Act of Congress that established the process for the Philippines, then an American territory, to become an independent country after a ten-year transition period. Under the act, the 1935 Constitution of the Philippines was written and the Commonwealth of the Philippines was established, with the first directly elected President of the Philippines. (Direct elections to the Philippine Legislature had been held since 1907.) It also established limitations on Filipino immigration to the United States.

The act was authored in the 73rd United States Congress by Senator Millard E. Tydings (Dem.) of Maryland and Representative John McDuffie (Dem.) of Alabama, and signed into law by President Franklin D. Roosevelt.

Provisions
The Tydings–McDuffie Act specified a procedural framework for the drafting of a constitution for the government of the Commonwealth of the Philippines within two years of its enactment. The act specified a number of mandatory constitutional provisions, and required approval of the constitution by the U.S. President and by Filipinos. The act mandated U.S. recognition of independence of the Philippine Islands as a separate and self-governing nation after a ten-year transition period.

Prior to independence, the act allowed the U.S to maintain military forces in the Philippines and to call all military forces of the Philippine government into U.S. military service. The act empowered the U.S. President, within two years following independence, to negotiate matters relating to U.S. naval reservations and fueling stations of in the Philippine Islands.

Immigration
The act reclassified all Filipinos, including those who were living in the United States, as aliens for the purposes of immigration to America. A quota of 50 immigrants per year was established. Before this act, Filipinos were classified as United States nationals, but not United States citizens, and while they were allowed to migrate relatively freely, they were denied naturalization rights within the US, unless they were citizens by birth in the mainland US.

History

In 1934, Manuel L. Quezon, the President of the Senate of the Philippines, headed a "Philippine Independence mission" to Washington, D.C. It successfully lobbied Congress and secured the act's passage.

In 1935, under the provisions of the act, the 1935 Constitution of the Philippines was drafted and became law, establishing the Commonwealth of the Philippines with an elected executive, the President of the Philippines.

In accordance with the act, President Harry S. Truman issued Proclamation 2695 of July 4, 1946, officially recognizing the independence of the Philippines.

Immigration

The immigration quota under the act was low, and immigration continued at levels much higher than the legal quota. This was due to the strength of agricultural lobbies, such as the Hawaiian sugar planters, which were able to successfully lobby the federal government to allow more male Filipino agricultural workers provided that they demonstrated a need.  This further increased the Filipino population in Hawaii which had at one point been 25% of agricultural workers on the islands.

The act also led to the Filipino Repatriation Act of 1935.

This act extended the Asian-exclusion policy of the Immigration Act of 1924 to the soon-to-be-former territory. This policy hampered the domestic lives of many Filipinos within the US because any Filipino who wished to go to the Philippines and then return to the United States would be subject to the restrictions on Asian immigration to America and would likely never be allowed to return.

In 1946, the US decreased the tight restrictions of the Tydings–McDuffie Act with the Luce–Celler Act of 1946, which increased the quota of Filipino immigrants to 100 per year and gave Filipinos the right to become naturalized American citizens. Filipinos would have been barred from immigrating to the U.S. without the Act. Two days later, on July 4, 1946, the Philippines became independent with the signing of the Treaty of Manila.

See also
 History of the Philippines (1898–1946)
 Philippine Organic Act (1902)
 Hare–Hawes–Cutting Act

References

External links

 Text of the Tydings–McDuffie Act

1934 in American law
1934 in international relations
1934 in the Philippines
Filipino-American history
Law of the Philippines
Philippines–United States relations
United States federal territory and statehood legislation
Presidency of Franklin D. Roosevelt